The FTW ("Fuck the World") Championship (also referred to as the FTW World Championship) is a professional wrestling championship created by Taz in Extreme Championship Wrestling (ECW) in 1998. The championship was retired in 1999 after being unified with the ECW World Heavyweight Championship, and remained inactive for 21 years until being re-established by Taz in All Elite Wrestling (AEW) in 2020. In both ECW and AEW, the FTW Championship has been presented as an "outlaw" or "renegade" title which is unsanctioned by officials in-storyline. The current champion is Hook, the son of Taz, who is in his first reign.

History

Extreme Championship Wrestling (1998–1999) 

The FTW Heavyweight Championship was designed, created, and conceived by Taz who also owns the rights to the design of the title. The title was used to compensate for storylines that had to be dropped due to injuries. ECW World Heavyweight Champion Shane Douglas had a serious sinus infection and an elbow injury. Taz and Al Snow also missed their matches at Wrestlepalooza 1998 due to health problems. ECW Owner Paul Heyman said the title suited Taz's "bad-ass, no-nonsense" attitude."

Taz announced the creation of the FTW Heavyweight Championship (also referred to as the Brooklyn World Championship) on May 14, 1998 at It Ain't Seinfeld. In the storyline, he was frustrated by his inability to challenge for the ECW World Heavyweight Championship due to Champion Shane Douglas' injury and refusal to face him. Taz created and defended his own World title, billing himself as the "real" World champion. He states that fans appreciated the message conveyed by the belt, which represented contempt for bosses and society, and says that he believes it was more appreciated than the company's top title. The belt was billed as "unrecognized" by ECW.

Taz lost the title only once, in a singles match against Sabu. This was an intentional loss, when he pulled an unconscious Sabu over himself on December 19, 1998 (he was confident that he would defeat Shane Douglas in an upcoming title bout, and thus no longer needed the FTW Heavyweight Championship). Taz regained the title at Living Dangerously on March 21, 1999, where he unified the FTW Heavyweight Championship with the ECW World Heavyweight Championship (which he then held) by defeating Sabu in a title versus title match. Taz then began using only the ECW World Heavyweight Championship belt, being the sole World Heavyweight Champion in the promotion.

All Elite Wrestling (2020–present)
On Night 2 of Fyter Fest, Taz, who owns the rights to the title, reinstated the title and awarded the FTW Championship to Brian Cage. Jon Moxley was unable to defend the AEW World Championship in their scheduled title match that night as he was self-quarantining after his wife Renee Young had tested positive for COVID-19, mirroring the circumstances behind the title's inception.

Belt designs

When the title was first created, the FTW belt was a custom ECW Television Championship belt with a leather strap painted orange, stickers partially covering the belt, and a "TAZ" logo at the top. "FTW" stickers were strategically placed over the word "Television" in the middle of the belt as well as the United States and United Kingdom flags on the side plates. A few months later, in an attempt to persuade Taz to team with Sabu and Rob Van Dam against Shane Douglas and The Triple Threat, Bill Alfonso presented Taz with an original FTW belt featuring a black leather strap and orange-accented bronze plates, with a "TAZ" logo engraved in the belt's centerplate. This second design would also be used for the belt after its reintroduction in AEW. Taz states that the concept and attitude have been replicated by other companies.

According to Taz on The Rise and Fall of ECW DVD documentary, when Sabu won the title he was legitimately upset backstage over Taz's name being permanently displayed on the belt. From then on, whenever Sabu had the belt with him, he would cover the Taz logo with athletic tape and write "SABU" on it in magic marker.

Reigns

Names

Combined reigns

References

External links
Solie's title histories
Title History of the FTW Championship at Genickbruch.com

All Elite Wrestling championships
Extreme Championship Wrestling championships
Unsanctioned championships